The Louvre Saint-Honoré building is a historic structure in Paris, occupying an entire urban block between the rue de Rivoli (across the Louvre Palace), the place du Palais-Royal, the rue Saint-Honoré, and the , with a total floor surface of 47,000 square meters. It was originally erected in the early 1850s by the Pereire brothers who in 1855 opened an iconic hotel, the Grand Hôtel du Louvre, and an innovative street-level department store, branded from 1863 the Grands Magasins du Louvre. While the  closed in 1887, the  expanded and kept operating in the building until 1974. From 1978 to 2016 they were succeeded by a specialized mall of antiques shops, the Louvre des Antiquaires, while the upper floors were repurposed as rented office space. Since 2020, the building's lower levels have been undergoing conversion to become the new flagship home of the Fondation Cartier pour l'Art Contemporain.

Initial construction

The completion of the rue de Rivoli between the place du Louvre and the place des Pyramides was an early project of Haussmann's renovation of Paris as desired by Napoleon III, and coincided with the preparation of the Exposition Universelle (1855). They directed the construction of the massive urban block along the thoroughfare while Napoleon III's Louvre expansion was being completed across it.

Grand Hôtel du Louvre

Partly inspired by the Great Western Royal Hotel in London, it was the largest hotel in Europe, with over 700 rooms and a staff of 1,250. It provided interpreters and guides, a post office, a telegraph room and a bureau de change. Although the hotel’s common spaces were spectacularly opulent, it also catered to tourists with modest budgets as well as to the wealthy. A massive stairway led from the courtyard to the table d'hôte dining room, which often accommodated over 300 diners. There was also a more expensive restaurant, a salon  in length and a large billiard room. The modern hotel included many bathrooms and twenty lavatories. Another innovative feature was a pair of steam-powered lifts. Félix-Joseph Barrias was commissioned to paint frescoes in the monumental dining room, which was 40 meters long and 30 meters wide. An 1872 Baedeker guide described the Grand Hôtel du Louvre as "a huge, palatial edifice, the construction of which cost upwards of 50,000 £." 

In 1888 the  opened on the other side of the Place du Palais Royal, and has remained in the same location since then.

Grands Magasins du Louvre

As the hotel opened in 1855, the building's street level and mezzanine were devoted to a commercial mall with 41 luxury shops at the time of inauguration. Faré withdrew in 1857 and the company became , in which the Pereires took shares in the early 1860s. In 1865, it realised 15 million in sales and 41 million ten years later. It employed about 2,400 people, and Chauchard and Hériot became extremely rich. Following remodeling that started in the late 1860s, on  the department store opened an expansion that brought it to a floor surface of 13,700 square meters, which its boasted as the world's largest.

On ,  bought the whole building from the administrators, and subsequently tasked architect Henry Dubois with its remodeling including the transformation of the main interior courtyards into covered atriums.

After Auguste Hériot died in 1879, his brother  inherited his shares of the company. Chauchard sold his shares in 1885. Olympe in 1887 married Cyprienne Dubernet, a former saleswoman at the store, and directed the company alone until 1888, when first signs of his mental illness forced his resignation. He was succeeded by one of Émile Pereire's sons. In 1909, the company opened the Hôtel de Crillon on the Place de la Concorde, after its renovation. In 1930, the shares were registered in the official list of the Paris Bourse.

In 1909, the Grands Magasins expanded into an annex across rue de Marengo, connected to the main building by an underground passage. In 1914, following the start of World War I, part of the complex was repurposed as a military hospital managed by the Val-de-Grâce. In 1919, another annex was created for the expansion of reserve space across rue Saint-Honoré, designed by architect . That building was repurposed in 2002-2005 on a design by architect  with a distinctive metal screen in front of the facades, to host central offices of the French Ministry of Culture. The Grands Magasins du Louvre, however, suffered from the crisis of the 1930s and their activity declined significantly in 1933-1934.

An Avro Lancaster airplane from the No. 57 Squadron RAF, based at RAF East Kirkby, was hit by German flak and crashed into the building on the night of September 23, 1943, causing significant damage inside the building while leaving the exterior walls standing. The Canadian pilot, Joe Douglas Hogan, and six crew members were all killed. Repairs and additional structural changes were made in the immediate postwar period. From the mid-1950s, the Société du Louvre started renting out office space in the upper levels to prestige tenants, e.g. IBM, and street-level commercial space to third-party retailers, e.g. Prisunic.

Louvre des Antiquaires

The building was entirely reconstructed by its new owner, with demolition works starting in February 1976, on a design by architect Wladimir Lentzy that only kept from the prior structure the street facades as well as the façades of the westernmost inner courtyard. It also hosted occasional temporary exhibitions.

In 1987, the  opened an offshoot in New York City, but that was closed in 1992.

After years of financial trouble and an increasing number of vacancies, the  closed in 2016.

Fondation Cartier – Louvre Palais Royal

Since 2020, the SFL has redeveloped the property on designs by architecture firms B.Architecture and Ateliers Jean Nouvel. As part of the redevelopment, the Fondation Cartier pour l'Art Contemporain will use 6,000 square meters on the former footprint of the Louvre des Antiquaires, as a new site branded . As of late 2022, the opening date was expected in 2024 or 2025.

In popular culture

The  inspired Émile Zola's novel Au Bonheur des Dames (1883).

Gallery

See also
 Debenhams
 Harrods
 Le Bon Marché
 
 Printemps
 La Samaritaine

Notes

Sources

External links

 Le Louvre des Antiquaires official website
 Exposition of Grand Magasin images hosted by the BNF
 Société du Louvre
 Concorde Hotels & Resort

Buildings and structures in the 1st arrondissement of Paris
Department stores of France
Pereire family